Jerusalem's population size and composition has shifted many times over its 5,000 year history.

Most population data pre-1905 is based on estimates, often from foreign travellers or organisations, since previous census data usually covered wider areas such as the Jerusalem District. These estimates suggest that since the end of the Crusades, Muslims formed the largest group in Jerusalem until the mid-19th century. Between 1838 and 1876, a number of estimates exist which conflict as to whether Jews or Muslims were the largest group during this period, and between 1882 and 1922 estimates conflict as to exactly when Jews became a majority of the population.

In 2020, the population was 951,100, of which Jews comprised 570,100 (59.9%), Muslims 353.800 (37.2%), Christians 16.300 (1.7%), and 10,800 unclassified (1.1%).

Overview

Jerusalemites are of varied national, ethnic and religious denominations and include European, Asian and African Jews, Arabs of Sunni Shafi‘i Muslim, Melkite Orthodox, Melkite Catholic, Latin Catholic, and Protestant backgrounds, Armenians of the Armenian Orthodox and Armenian Catholic , Assyrians largely of the Syriac Orthodox Church and Syriac Catholic Church, Maronites, and Copts. Many of these groups were once immigrants or pilgrims that have over time become near-indigenous populations and claim the importance of Jerusalem to their faith as their reason for moving to and being in the city.

Jerusalem's long history of conquests by competing and different powers has resulted in different groups living in the city many of whom have never fully identified or assimilated with a particular power, despite the length of their rule. Though they may have been citizens of that particular kingdom and empire and involved with civic activities and duties, these groups often saw themselves as distinct national groups (see Armenians, for example). The Ottoman millet system, whereby minorities in the Ottoman Empire were given the authority to govern themselves within the framework of the broader system, allowed these groups to retain autonomy and remain separate from other religious and national groups. Some Palestinian residents of the city prefer to use the term Maqdisi or Qudsi as a Palestinian demonym.

Historical population by religion
The tables below provide data on demographic change over time in Jerusalem, with an emphasis on the Jewish population. Readers should be aware that the boundaries of Jerusalem have changed many times over the years and that Jerusalem may also refer to a district or even a subdistrict under Ottoman, British, or Israeli administration, see e.g. Jerusalem District. Thus, year-to-year comparisons may not be valid due to the varying geographic areas covered by the population censuses.

Persian period
The population of Jerusalem during Persian rule in Judea (province of Yehud Medinata) is estimated at between 1,500 and 2,750.

1st century Judea

During the First Jewish–Roman War (66–73 CE), the population of Jerusalem was estimated at 600,000 persons by Roman historian Tacitus, while Josephus estimated that there were as many as 1,100,000 who were killed in the war—though this number included people who did not belong to the city itself. Josephus also wrote that 97,000 Jews were sold as slaves. After the Roman victory over the Jews, as many as 115,880 dead bodies were carried out through one gate between the months of Nisan and Tammuz.

Modern estimates of Jerusalem's population during the final Roman Siege of Jerusalem in 70 (CE) are variously 70,398 by Wilkinson in 1974, 80,000 by Broshi in 1978, and 60,000–70,000 by Levine in 2002. According to Josephus, the populations of adult male scholarly sects were as follows: over 6,000 Pharisees, more than 4,000 Essenes and "a few" Sadducees. New Testament scholar Cousland notes that "recent estimates of the population of Jerusalem suggest something in the neighbourhood of a hundred thousand". A minimalist view is taken by Hillel Geva, who estimates from archaeological evidence that the population of Jerusalem before its 70 CE destruction was at most 20,000.

Middle Ages
Al-Maqdisi, a 10th century native of Jerusalem writing prior to the crusades, reports that "everywhere the Christians and Jews have the upper hand and the mosque is void of congregation".

* Indicates families.

Early Ottoman era

Modern era

Muslim "relative majority"
Henry Light, who visited Jerusalem in 1814, reported that Muslims comprised the largest portion of the 12,000 person population, but that Jews made the greatest single sect. In 1818, Robert Richardson, family doctor to the Earl of Belmore, estimated the number of Jews to be 10,000, twice the number of Muslims.

Muslim or Jewish "relative majority"
Between 1838 and 1876, conflicting estimates exist regarding whether Muslims or Jews constituted a "relative majority" (or plurality) in the city.

Writing in 1841, the biblical scholar Edward Robinson noted the conflicting demographic estimates regarding Jerusalem during the period, stating in reference to an 1839 estimate attributed to the Moses Montefiore: "As to the Jews, the enumeration in question was made out by themselves, in the expectation of receiving a certain amount of alms for every name returned. It is therefore obvious that they here had as strong a motive to exaggerate their number, as they often have in other circumstances to underrate it. Besides, this number of 7000 rests merely on report; Sir Moses himself has published nothing on the subject; nor could his agent in London afford me any information so late as Nov. 1840." In 1843, Reverend F.C. Ewald, a Christian traveler visiting Jerusalem, reported an influx of 150 Jews from Algiers. He wrote that there were now a large number of Jews from the coast of Africa who were forming a separate congregation.

From the mid-1850s, following the Crimean War, the expansion of Jerusalem outside of the Old City began, with institutions including the Russian Compound, Kerem Avraham, the Schneller Orphanage, Bishop Gobat school and the Mishkenot Sha'ananim marking the beginning of permanent settlement outside the Jerusalem Old City walls.

Between 1856 and 1880, Jewish immigration to Palestine more than doubled, with the majority settling in Jerusalem. The majority of these immigrants were Ashkenazi Jews from Eastern Europe, who subsisted on Halukka.

Jews as absolute or relative majority
Published in 1883, the PEF Survey of Palestine volume which covered the region noted that "The number of the Jews has of late increased at the rate of 1,000 to 1,500 per annum. Since 1875 the population of Jerusalem has rapidly increased. The number of Jews is now estimated at 15,000 to 20,000, and the population, including the inhabitants of the new suburbs, reaches a total of about 40,000 souls."

In 1881–82, a group of Jews arrived from Yemen as a result of messianic fervor, in the phase known as the First Aliyah. After living in the Old City for several years, they moved to the hills facing the City of David, where they lived in caves. In 1884, the community, numbering 200, moved to new stone houses  built for them by a Jewish charity.

The Jewish population of Jerusalem, as for wider Palestine, increased further during the Third Aliyah of 1919–23 following the Balfour Declaration. Prior to this, a British survey in 1919 noted that most Jews in Jerusalem were largely Orthodox and that a minority were Zionists.

After Jerusalem Law

As of 24 May 2006, Jerusalem's population was 724,000 (about 10% of the total population of Israel), of which 65.0% were Jews (c. 40% of whom live in East Jerusalem), 32.0% Muslim (almost all of whom live in East Jerusalem) and 2% Christian. 35% of the city's population were children under age of 15. In 2005, the city had 18,600 newborns.

These official Israeli statistics refer to the expanded Israel municipality of Jerusalem. This includes not only the area of the pre-1967 Israeli and Jordanian municipalities, but also outlying Palestinian villages and neighbourhoods east of the city, which were not part of Jordanian East Jerusalem prior to 1967. Demographic data from 1967 to 2012 showed continues growth of Arab population, both in relative and absolute numbers, and the declining  of Jewish population share in the overall population of the city. In 1967, Jews were  73.4% of city population, while in 2010 the Jewish population shrank to 64%. In the same period the Arab population increased from 26,5% in 1967 to 36% in 2010. In 1999, the Jewish total fertility rate was 3.8 children per woman, while the Palestinian rate was 4.4. This led to concerns that Arabs would eventually become a majority of the city's population.

Between 1999 and 2010, the demographic trends reversed themselves, with the Jewish fertility rate increasing and the Arab rate decreasing. In addition, the number of Jewish immigrants from abroad choosing to settle in Jerusalem steadily increased. By 2010, there was a higher Jewish than Arab growth rate. That year, the city's birth rate was placed at 4.2 children for Jewish mothers, compared with 3.9 children for Arab mothers. In addition, 2,250 Jewish immigrants from abroad settled in Jerusalem. The Jewish fertility rate is believed to be still currently increasing, while the Arab fertility rate remains on the decline.

In 2016, Jerusalem had a population of 882,700, of which Jews comprised 536,600 (60.8%), Muslims 319,800 (36.2%), Christians 15,800 (1.8%), and 10,300 unclassified (1.2%).

In 2020, the population was 951,100, of which Jews comprised 570,100 (59.9%), Muslims 353.800 (37.2%), Christians 16.300 (1.7%), and 10,800 unclassified (1.1%).

Demographic key dates
 4500–3500 BCE: First settlement established near Gihon Spring (earliest archeological evidence)
 c. 1550–1400 BCE: Jerusalem becomes a vassal to the New Kingdom of Egypt
 c. 1000 BCE: According to the Bible, King David conquers Jerusalem and makes it the capital of the Kingdom of Israel (2 Samuel 5:6–7:6). His son King Solomon builds the First Jewish Temple on the Temple Mount.
 732 BCE: Jerusalem becomes a vassal of the Neo-Assyrian Empire
 587–586 BCE: Conquest of Jerusalem by Babylonians; Nebuchadnezzar II fought Pharaoh Apries's attempt to invade Judah. Jerusalem mostly destroyed including the First Temple, and the city's prominent citizens deported to Babylon (Biblical sources only)
 539 BCE: Cyrus the Great conquers Babylon, allowing Babylonian Jews to return from the Babylonian captivity to Jerusalem and rebuild the Temple (Biblical sources only, see Cyrus (Bible) and the Return to Zion)
 530 BCE: The Second Jewish Temple was rebuilt, on the same Temple Mount as the first Jewish Temple.
 350 BCE: Jerusalem revolts against Artaxerxes III, who retakes the city and burns it down in the process. Jews who supported the revolt are sent to Hyrcania on the Caspian Sea.
 332–200 BCE: Jerusalem capitulates to Alexander the Great, and is later incorporated into the Ptolemaic Kingdom (301BCE) and Seleucid Empire (200BCE).
 175 BCE: Antiochus IV Epiphanes accelerates Seleucid efforts to eradicate the Jewish religion, outlaws Sabbath and circumcision, sacks Jerusalem and erects an altar to Zeus in the Second Temple after plundering it.
 164 BCE: The Hasmoneans take control of part of Jerusalem, whilst the Seleucids retain control of the Acra (fortress) in the city and most surrounding areas.
 63 BCE: Roman Empire under Pompey takes city
 70 CE: Titus ends the major portion of First Jewish–Roman War and destroys Herod's Temple. The Sanhedrin is relocated to Yavne, and the city's leading Christians relocate to Pella
 136: Hadrian formally reestablishes the city as Aelia Capitolina, and forbids Jewish and Christian presence in the city. Restrictions over Christian presence in the city are relaxed two years later.
 324–325: Emperor Constantine holds the First Council of Nicaea and confirms status of Jerusalem as a Christian patriarchate. A significant wave of Christian immigration to the city begins. The ban on Jews entering the city remains in force, but they are allowed to enter once a year to pray at the Western Wall on Tisha B'Av
 c. 380: Tyrannius Rufinus and Melania the Elder found the first monastery in Jerusalem on the Mount of Olives
 614: Jerusalem falls to Jewish and Persian forces, specifically Khosrow II's Sasanian Empire until it is retaken in 629. This was a result of the Jewish revolt against Heraclius, a Jewish insurrection against the Byzantine Empire across the Levant. The Church of the Holy Sepulchre is burned and much of the Christian population is massacred.
 636–637: Caliph Umar conquers Jerusalem. According to Muhammad ibn Jarir al-Tabari, Patriarch Sophronius and Umar are reported to have agreed the Pact of Umar, which guaranteed Christians freedom of religion but prohibited Jews from living in the city. The Armenian Apostolic Church began appointing its own bishop in Jerusalem in 638. A surviving Jewish chronicle from the Cairo Geniza however states that Umar permitted seventy Jewish families to settle in the city. The Jews requested to settle in the southern part of the city near the Temple Mount which was granted, evidence of this location of the Jewish quarter is provided in a Geniza letter dated 1064. Later Jewish texts from tenth and eleventh century also indicate the "King of Ishmael" allowing them to settle in the city.
 797: Abbasid–Carolingian alliance – the Church of the Holy Sepulchre was restored and the Latin hospital was enlarged, encouraging Christian travel to the city.
 1009–1030: Fatimid Caliph Al-Hakim orders destruction of churches and synagogues in the empire, including the Church of the Holy Sepulchre. Caliph Ali az-Zahir authorizes them rebuilt 20 years later.
 1077: Jerusalem revolts against the rule of Emir Atsiz ibd Uvaq who retakes the city and massacres the local population.
 1099: First Crusaders capture Jerusalem and slaughter most of the city's Muslim and Jewish inhabitants. The Dome of the Rock is converted into a church.
 1187: Saladin captures Jerusalem from Crusaders and allows Jewish and Orthodox Christian settlement. The Dome of the Rock is converted to an Islamic center of worship again.
 1229: A 10-year treaty is signed allowing Christians freedom to live in the unfortified city. The Ayyubids retained control of the Muslim holy places.
 1244: Mercenary army of Khwarazmians destroyed the city.
 1260: Jerusalem raided by the Mongols under Nestorian Christian general Kitbuqa. Hulagu Khan sends a message to Louis IX of France that Jerusalem remitted to the Christians under the Franco-Mongol alliance
 1267: Nahmanides goes to Jerusalem and prays at the Western Wall. Reported to have found only two Jewish families in the city
 1482: The visiting Dominican priest Felix Fabri described Jerusalem as "a collection of all manner of abominations". As "abominations" he listed Saracens, Greeks, Syrians, Jacobites, Abyssianians, Nestorians, Armenians, Gregorians, Maronites, Turcomans, Bedouins, Assassins, a sect possibly Druzes, Mamelukes, and "the most accursed of all", Jews. Only the Latin Christians "long with all their hearts for Christian princes to come and subject all the country to the authority of the Church of Rome".
 1517: The Ottoman Empire captures Jerusalem under Sultan Selim I who proclaims himself Caliph of the Islamic world
 1604: First Protectorate of missions agreed, in which the Christian subjects of Henry IV of France were free to visit the Holy Places of Jerusalem. French missionaries begin to travel to Jerusalem.
 1700: Judah the Pious and 1,000 followers settle in Jerusalem.
 1774: The Treaty of Küçük Kaynarca is signed giving Russia the right to protect all Christians in Jerusalem.
 1821: Greek War of Independence – Jerusalem's Christian population (the majority being Greek Orthodox), were forced by the Ottoman authorities to relinquish their weapons, wear black and help improve the city's fortifications
 1837: Galilee earthquake of 1837 results in Jews from Safed and Tiberias resettling in Jerusalem.
 1839–1840: Rabbi Judah Alkalai publishes "The Pleasant Paths" and "The Peace of Jerusalem", urging the return of European Jews to Jerusalem and Palestine.
 1853–1854: A treaty is signed confirming France and the Roman Catholic Church as the supreme authority in the Holy Land with control over the Church of the Holy Sepulchre, contravening the 1774 treaty with Russia and triggering the Crimean War.
 1860: The first Jewish neighborhood (Mishkenot Sha'ananim) outside the Old City walls is built, in an area later known as Yemin Moshe, by Moses Montefiore and Judah Touro.
 1862: Moses Hess publishes Rome and Jerusalem, arguing for a Jewish homeland in Palestine centered on Jerusalem
 1873–1875: Mea Shearim is built.
 1882: The First Aliyah results in 35,000 Jewish immigrants entering the Palestine region
 1901: Ottoman restrictions on Jewish immigration to and land acquisition in Jerusalem district take effect
 1901–1914: The Second Aliyah results in 40,000 Jewish immigrants entering the Palestine region
 1917: The Ottomans are defeated at the Battle of Jerusalem during the World War I and the British Army takes control. The Balfour Declaration had been issued a month before.
 1919–1923: The Third Aliyah results in 35,000 Jewish immigrants entering the Mandatory Palestine region
 1924–1928: The Fourth Aliyah results in 82,000 Jewish immigrants entering the Mandatory Palestine region
 1929–1939: The Fifth Aliyah results in 250,000 Jewish immigrants entering the Mandatory Palestine region
 1947–1949: Palestine war led to displacement of Palestinian Arab and Jewish populations in the city and its division. All Jewish residents of the eastern part of the city were expelled by Arab forces and the entire Jewish Quarter was destroyed. Palestinian Arab villages such as Lifta, al-Maliha, Ayn Karim and Deir Yassin were depopulated.
 1967: The Six-Day War results in East Jerusalem being captured by Israel and few weeks later expansion of the Israeli Jerusalem Municipality to East Jerusalem and some surrounding area. The Old City is captured by the IDF and the Moroccan Quarter, comprising 135 houses and the 12th-century Afdaliya or Sheikh Eid Mosque, is demolished, creating a plaza in front of the Western Wall. Israel declares Jerusalem unified and announces free access to holy sites of all religions.

See also 
Demographic history of Palestine (region)
History of Jerusalem
List of people from Jerusalem

References

Bibliography
 
 
 
 Salo Baron, A Social and Religious History of the Jews, Columbia University Press, 1983.
 
 Israeli Central Bureau of Statistics information page
 Jerusalem: Jewish, Muslim, and Christian Population (1910–2000) at israelipalestinianprocon.org
 Bruce Masters, Christians And Jews In The Ottoman Arab World, Cambridge University Press, 2004.
 Population of Jerusalem until 1945 (Table 10) at mideastweb.org
  
 
 Runciman, Steven (1980). The First Crusade. Cambridge. .
 
 
  
 
 

History of Jerusalem
Jerusalem
Jerusalem
Culture of Jerusalem
Jerusalem